Borwick Hall is a 16th-century manor house at Borwick, Lancashire, England. It is a Grade I listed building and is now used as a residential outdoor education and conference centre by Lancashire County Council.

History
The manor of Borwick is mentioned in the Domesday Book as being part of the estates of Roger of Poitou but the oldest parts of the building still in existence date from the 14th century when a pele tower was built on the site. It was bought c. 1590 by Roger Bindlosse.

The tower was extended to a manor house by Roger in the early 1590s before he died in 1595. His son Robert inherited and was appointed High Sheriff of Lancashire in 1615. Robert's son Sir Francis Bindlosse predeceased him and so the estate passed to Francis's eldest son, Robert, who was created a baronet in 1641 and was elected MP for Lancashire in 1660. He also served twice as High Sheriff. He built a private Oratory on the estate. On his death in 1688 with no male heir the baronetcy became extinct and the estate passed to his only daughter, Cecilia, who had married William Standish. On her death there were again no male heirs and the estate passed to a daughter who had married Thomas Strickland of the Sizergh family. The Scottish soldier Charlie MacDougal is believed to have died in the grounds in 1745 following the infighting between the Scots returning from England with Bonnie Prince Charlie. The Stricklands sold the Hall in 1854 for £28,000 to Col. Marton of Capernwray.

By the early 19th century the Hall was falling into disrepair and was only repaired in the 1910s, when it was leased to music critic John Alexander Fuller Maitland on the specific condition that he restore the building. He died there in 1936.

After the Second World War during which the hall was used as a military base, the estate was sold to Lancashire Youth Clubs Association and later passed into the ownership of Lancashire County Council.

The Hall was used for exterior shots for the children's TV programme The Ghosts of Motley Hall which ran on Granada TV from 1976 to 1978. The Hall stood in for the fictional Motley Hall, built in 1577, home to the Uproar family over the centuries, but now home to a group of ghosts from different eras.

Construction
Externally the Hall is built of stone rubble with sandstone dressing and a slate roof. Due to its exceptional features it was listed as a Grade I listed building in 1967.

See also

Grade I listed buildings in Lancashire
Listed buildings in Borwick

Notes

References

External links
 Lancashire Outdoor Education: Borwick Hall

Houses completed in the 16th century
Towers completed in the 14th century
Grade I listed buildings in Lancashire
Buildings and structures in the City of Lancaster
Outdoor education organizations
Peel towers in Lancashire